Many Japanese words of Portuguese origin entered the Japanese language when Portuguese Jesuit priests introduced Christian ideas, Western science, technology and new products to the Japanese during the Muromachi period (15th and 16th centuries).

The Portuguese were the first Europeans to reach Japan and the first to establish direct trade between Japan and Europe, in 1543. During the 16th and 17th century, Portuguese Jesuits had undertaken a great work of Catechism, that ended only with religious persecution in the early Edo period (Tokugawa Shogunate). The Portuguese were the first to translate Japanese to a Western language, in the Nippo Jisho (日葡辞書, literally the "Japanese-Portuguese Dictionary") or Vocabulario da Lingoa de Iapam compiled by Portuguese Jesuit João Rodrigues, and published in Nagasaki in 1603, who also wrote a grammar . The dictionary of Japanese-Portuguese explained 32,000 Japanese words translated into Portuguese. Most of these words refer to the products and customs that first came to Japan via the Portuguese traders.

List of direct loanwords
Many of the first words which were introduced and entered the Japanese language from Portuguese and Dutch are written in kanji or hiragana, rather than katakana, which is the more common way to write loanwords in Japanese in modern times.  Kanji versions of the words are ateji, characters that are "fitted" or "applied" to the words by the Japanese, based on either the pronunciation or the meaning of the word.

The † indicates the word is archaic and no longer in use.

{| class="wikitable"
|-
! Japanese Rōmaji
! Japanese script
! Japanese meaning
! Pre-modern Portuguese
! Modern Portuguese
! English translation of Portuguese
! Notes
|-
| † anjo
| アンジョ
| angel
| anjo
| anjo
| angel
|
|-
| † bateren
| 伴天連 / 破天連
| a missionary priest (mainly from Jesuit)
| padre
| padre
| priest
| used in early Christianity
|-
| battera
| ばってら / :ja:バッテラ
| kind of sushi
| bateira
| bateira, barco
| boat
| named after its shape
|-
| beranda
| ベランダ
| balcony
| varanda
| varanda
| balcony
|
|-
| bīdama
| :ja:ビー玉
| marbles (spheric-shaped)
| ----
| berlindes, bola-de-gude, bolinha-de-gude
| marbles
| abbrev. of bīdoro (Japanese: 'glass', also from Portuguese: see below) + tama (Japanese: 'ball').
|-
| bīdoro
| ビードロ
|
| vidro
| vidro
| glass
| 
|-
| birōdo
| ビロード / 天鵞絨
| velvet
| veludo
| veludo
| velvet
| berubetto (from English velvet) is also used today.
|-
| bōro
| :ja:ボーロ / ぼうろ
| a kind of small biscuit or cookie
| bolo
| bolo
| cake
|
|-
| botan
| ボタン / 釦 / 鈕
| button
| botão
| botão
| button
| 
|-
| charumera
| :ja:チャルメラ
| small double-reed wind instrument
| charamela
| charamela (caramelo, "caramel", is cognate)
| shawm (cf. the cognate chalumeau)
| formerly played in Japan by ramen vendors
|-
| chokki
| チョッキ
| waistcoat (UK); vest (U.S.); Jacket
| jaque
| colete, jaqueta
| waistcoat (UK); vest (U.S.); Jacket
| Besuto (from English vest) is common today.
|-
| † Deusu
| デウス
| Christian God
| Deus
| Deus
| God
|
|-
| † dochirina
| ドチリナ
| doctrine
| doutrina
| doutrina
| doctrine
|
|-
| furasuko
| :ja:フラスコ
| laboratory flask
| frasco
| frasco
| flask
| 
|-
| hiryūzu
| :ja:飛竜頭
| Deep-fried glutinous rice balls; alternatively, fried tofu balls with mixed vegetables, also known as ganmodoki
| filhós
| filhós
| 
|
|-
| igirisu
| イギリス / 英吉利
| the United Kingdom
| inglez
| inglês
| English (adj); Englishman
| 
|-
| † inheruno
| インヘルノ
| Christian hell
| inferno
| inferno
| hell
| 
|-
| † iruman
| イルマン / 入満 / 伊留満 / 由婁漫
| missionary next in line to become a priest
| irmão
| irmão
| brother
| used in early Christianity
|-
| jōro
| :ja:じょうろ / 如雨露
| watering can
| jarro
| jarro
| jug, watering can
| "possibly from Portuguese" (Kōjien dictionary)
|-
| juban/jiban
| じゅばん / :ja:襦袢
| undervest for kimono
| gibão
| –
| undervest
| The French form jupon led to zubon (trousers).
|-
| kabocha
| :ja:カボチャ / 南瓜
|
| Camboja (abóbora)
| (abóbora) cabotiá
| Cambodia (-n pumpkin)
| Was thought to be from Cambodia, imported by the Portuguese.
|-
| kanakin/kanekin
| 金巾 / かなきん / かねきん
| shirting, percale
| canequim
|
| unbleached muslin/calico
| jargon from the textile business
|-
| † kandeya
| カンデヤ
| oil lamp
| candeia, candela
| vela, candeia
| candle
| extinct. Kantera from Dutch kandelaar was also used.
|-
| † kapitan
| 甲比丹 / 甲必丹
| captain (of ships from Europe in The Age of Discovery)
| capitão
| capitão
| captain
| extinct. Japanese word senchō or the English form kyaputen (captain) is now used
|-
| kappa
| :ja:合羽
| raincoat
| capa
| capa (de chuva)
| raincoat, coat
| reinkōto (from English raincoat) is prevalent nowadays.
|-
| karuta
| :ja:かるた / 歌留多
| karuta cards, a traditional type of playing cards which is largely different from the modern worldwide ones.
| cartas (de jogar)
| cartas (de jogar)
| (playing) cards
| 
|-
| karusan
| カルサン
| a specific kind of hakama trousers
| calsan
| calçao
| trousers
|-
| kasutera, kasutēra, kasuteira
| :ja:カステラ
| Kind of sponge cake
| (Pão de) Castela
| (Pão de) Castela
| (Bread/cake of) Castile
| Theories cite Portuguese castelo (castle) or the region of Castile (Castela in Portuguese).  The cake itself may originally derive from bizcocho, a Spanish kind of biscotti.
|-
| † kirishitan
| :ja:キリシタン / 切支丹 / 吉利支丹 (Also written in the more negative forms 鬼理死丹 and 切死丹 after Christianity was banned by the Tokugawa Shogunate)
| Christian people in 16th and 17th centuries (who were severely persecuted by the Shogunate)
| christão
| cristão
| Christian
| Today's Christian people are Kurisuchan (from English Christian).
|-
| kirisuto
| キリスト / 基督
| Christ
| Christo
| Cristo
| Christ
| 
|-
| koendoro
| コエンドロ
| coriander
| coentro
| coentro
| coriander
| 
|-
| konpeitō
| 金米糖 / :ja:金平糖 / 金餅糖
| Kind of star-shaped candy
| confeito
| confeito
| confection, candies
| (related to confetti)
|-
| koppu
| コップ
| cup
| copo
| copo
| cup
|
|-
| † kurusu
| クルス
| Christian cross
| cruz
| cruz
| cross
| used in early Christianity, now jūjika (cross), a kanji translation
|-
| manto
| :ja:マント
| cloak
| manto
| manto
| cloak
| 
|-
| marumero
| :ja:マルメロ
| quince
| marmelo
| marmelo
| quince
| 
|-
| meriyasu
| :ja:メリヤス / 莫大小
| a kind of knit textile
| medias
| meias
| hosiery, knitting
| 
|-
| mīra
| ミイラ / 木乃伊
| mummy
| mirra
| mirra
| myrrh
| Originally, mummies embalmed using myrrh.
|-
| †nataru
| ナタル
| Christmas
| Natal
| Natal
| Christmas
| Annual festival celebrating the birth of Jesus Christ
|-
| oranda
| オランダ / 和蘭(陀) / 阿蘭陀
| The Netherlands, Holland
| Hollanda
| Holanda, Países Baixos
| The Netherlands, Holland
| 
|-
| orugan
| :ja:オルガン
| organ (music)
| orgão
| órgão
| organ
| 
|-
| pan
| :ja:パン
| bread
| pão
| pão
| bread
| Often wrongly connected to the Spanish pan or the French pain, both with the same meaning and the same Latinate origin. The word was introduced into Japan by Portuguese missionaries.
|-
| † paraiso
| パライソ
| paradise. Specifically in reference to the Christian ideal of heavenly paradise.
| paraíso
| paraíso
| paradise
| 
|-
| pin kara kiri made
| ピンからキリまで
| running the whole gamut, jumble of wheat and tares
| (pinta, cruz)
| (pinta, cruz)
| (dot, cross)
| literally 'from pin to kiri'''
|-
| rasha| :ja:ラシャ / 羅紗
| a kind of wool woven textile
| raxa
| – (feltro)
| felt
| 
|-
| rozario| ロザリオ
| rosary
| rosario
| rosário
| rosary
| 
|-
| † sabato| サバト
| Saturday
| sábado
| sábado
| Saturday
| 
|-
| saboten| :ja:サボテン / 仙人掌
| cactus
| sabão
| sabão
| soap
| The derivation is said to come from the soap-like feature of its juice, although there are controversies. cf. shabon|-
| Santa Maria| サンタマリア
| Saint Mary
| Santa Maria
| Santa Maria
| Saint Mary
| Saint Mary
|-
| sarasa| :ja:更紗
| chintz
| saraça
| 
| chintz
| 
|-
| shabon| シャボン
| soap
| sabão
| sabão
| soap
| More likely from older Spanish xabon.  Usually seen in compounds such as shabon-dama ('soap bubbles') in modern Japanese.
|-
| shurasuko| :ja:シュラスコ
| Brazilian style churrasco barbecue
| 
| churrasco
| barbecue
|Modern borrowing.
|-
| subeta| スベタ
| (an insulting word for women)
| espada
| espada
| sword
| Originally a term from playing cards, in reference to certain cards that earned the player zero points.  This meaning extended to refer to "a boring, shabby, low person", and from there to mean "an unattractive woman".
|-
| tabako| タバコ / 煙草 / たばこ
| tobacco, cigarette
| 
| 
| tobacco, cigarette
| 
|-
| totan| :ja:トタン
|
| tutanaga
(Could be of other origin, as Nippo jisho implies.)
| 
| tutenag (a zinc alloy; zinc)
| The homophone "" is sometimes mistaken as an ateji for "", but is actually a different word of native origin meaning "agony".
|-
| tempura| :ja:天ぷら / 天麩羅 / 天婦羅
| deep-fried seafood/vegetables
| tempero, temperar;Tracking Down Tempura by Takashi Morieda  tempora
| tempero, temperar; tempora
| seasoning, to season; times of abstinence from meat
| 
|-
| zabon| :ja:ざぼん / 朱欒 / 香欒
| pomelo, shaddock
| zamboa
| zamboa
| pomelo, shaddock
| 
|-
| † zesu or zezusu| ゼス, ゼズス
| Jesus
| Jesu
| Jesus
| Jesus
| The modern term イエス (Iesu) is a reconstruction of the Ancient Greek term.
|}

List of indirect loanwords

False cognates
Some word pairs that appear similar are actually false cognates of unrelated origins.

Arigatō

It is often suggested that the Japanese word arigatō derives from the Portuguese obrigado, both of which mean "Thank you", but evidence indicates arigatō has a purely Japanese origin, so these two words are false cognates.Arigatō is an "u"-sound change of arigataku. In turn, arigataku is the adverbial form of an adjective arigatai, from older arigatashi, itself a compound of ari + katashi. Written records of arigatashi exist dating back to the Man'yōshū compiled in the 8th century AD, well before Japanese contact with the Portuguese in the 16th century.Ari is a conjugation of verb aru meaning "to be", and katashi is an adjective meaning "difficult", so arigatashi literally means "difficult to exist", hence "rare" and thus "precious", with usage shifting to indicate gratitude for receiving an outstanding kindness. The phrase to express such gratitude is arigatō gozaimasu, or arigatō'' for short.

Other words not of Portuguese origin

See also
Gairaigo
List of gairaigo and wasei-eigo terms
Japanese words of Dutch origin
Nippo Jisho, the first Japanese dictionary in a Western language

References

External links
sci.lang.japan FAQ Japanese words of Portuguese origin

Japanese Words Of Portuguese Origin
Portuguese
Japanese Portuguese
Japan
Words of Portuguese origin
Japan–Portugal relations
Portuguese language in Asia
Wikipedia glossaries using tables